James Hurley is a university professor known for his research into proteins. He won the 2014 Neurath Award from the Protein Society for a unique, recent contribution to basic science.

Education
Hurley trained in protein crystallography with Robert Stroud in at the University of California, San Francisco, where he completed a PhD in biophysics in 1990. He also trained with Brian Matthews at the University of Oregon, where he was a postdoctoral fellow from 1990 to 1992.

Career
Prior to entering academia, Hurley worked as an investigator at the National Institutes of Health (NIH).

Hurley is the Judy C. Webb Chair and Professor of Biochemistry, Biophysics and Structural Biology at the University of California, Berkeley. His research interests focus on the interplay between proteins and lipids. Hurley received the 2014 Neurath Award from the Protein Society. The award recognizes Hurley's "ground-breaking contributions to structural membrane biology and membrane trafficking." In 2014, Hurley co-authored a study highlighting the importance of a protein called Nef in HIV.

References

Year of birth missing (living people)
Living people
American biophysicists
University of California, Berkeley College of Letters and Science faculty
University of California, San Diego alumni
University of California, San Francisco alumni